The Smithson and McKay Brothers Blocks, located at 943 and 927 North Russell Street in Portland, Oregon, are included on the National Register of Historic Places.

See also
 National Register of Historic Places listings in North Portland, Oregon

References

1890 establishments in Oregon
Buildings and structures in Portland, Oregon
Commercial buildings completed in 1890
Commercial buildings on the National Register of Historic Places in Oregon
Italianate architecture in Oregon
National Register of Historic Places in Portland, Oregon
Romanesque Revival architecture in Oregon
North Portland, Oregon
Eliot, Portland, Oregon